West Poplar is the name given to the Canadian side of a border crossing on the Saskatchewan and Montana border.  It is located about three and a half hours southwest of Regina, Saskatchewan. The international border crosses into Valley County, Montana, north of the town of Opheim.

Climate

See also 
Opheim–West Poplar River Border Crossing
West Poplar Airport

References 

Old Post No. 43, Saskatchewan
Unincorporated communities in Saskatchewan
Division No. 3, Saskatchewan